= Mulliq Village Mill =

Cultural heritage monument of Kosovo

- Mulliri i fshatit Mulliq (Albanian)
- Location: Mulliq, Gjakova, Kosovo

History
- Built: 18th century

The Mulliq Village Mill is a cultural heritage monument in Mulliq, Gjakova, Kosovo.

The Mulliq Village Mill is one of Kosovo's best-preserved buildings to be made entirely of wood, from its foundation through its floor, walls, and roof. The villagers hold that it was built in the 19th century, though it has clearly been renovated since. The watermill’s grain grinding capacity is smaller than it once was. Its floor is made from beams, its wall supported by wooden studs lined with planks, and its roof covered with flat tile. Water flow is very modest, especially in the summer.
